Biksyanovo (Biksän) is a rural locality (a village) in Sayranovsky Selsoviet, Ishimbaysky District, Bashkortostan, Russia. The population was 513 as of 2010. There are 8 streets.

Geography 
Biksyanovo is located 28 km east of Ishimbay (the district's administrative centre) by road. Novoaptikovo is the nearest rural locality.

References 

Rural localities in Ishimbaysky District